Chichiriviche is a Venezuelan city located in Falcón state located on the east coast, 195 km southeast of Coro. Capital of Municipality Monseñor Iturriza. It has a population for 2011 of 18,960 inhabitants.
Chichiriviche is surrounded by the small cays and islands of fine white sand; to the west by the wetland Cuare Wildlife Refuge and to the south by Cuare Gulf.
Sparks originally inhabited by Native Americans Chipas, its name is a Caribbean word meaning "place where rises our sun"

Chichiriviche has achieved a sustained development of its tourism industry, with a service infrastructure that translates into luxury hotels, resorts, inns, restaurants, network of marinas, shops and places of nightlife.

Tourist Attractions

This eastern region is characterized as the main tourist destination of northwestern Venezuela.
On the east side of Chichiriviche are five islands belonging to Morrocoy National Park, these are: Sal Cay, Muerto Cay, Pelón Cay, Peraza Cay  and Sombrero Cay. To this is added the Continental Beach Punta Varadero.

On the west side is the Cuare Wildlife Refuge; in this landscape marine coastal birds of various colors offer a wonderful show.

On the south side opens the Cuare Gulf, in whose waters is reproduced much of the fish fauna of the states Zulia and Falcón. On the banks of gulf, on the cliff of Hill Chichiriviche is located a cave called Cueva del Indio with petroglyphs of more than 3500 years old. In this same area is the Grotto of the Virgin (Gruta de la Virgen), place of popular fervor, devotion and pilgrimage. With the mission to conserve aquatic environments, February 2, 1971 the member countries of the United Nations (UN) they approved on the shores of the Caspian Sea in the city of Ramsar, Iran, the first convention on Wetlands, reason it is leading to celebrate on this date the International Day of these ecosystems and this 2015 is commemorated under the theme Wetlands for our future.

The Conference of the Parties (COP) is the highest decision-making on the implementation of the Ramsar Convention, which meets every three years and its powers is the decision to include or exclude areas from the list of wetlands of international importance. Wetlands are considered the most productive ecosystems in the world. Provide water and basic living to the plant and animal species for its survival, including humans. These ecosystems, as well as being a source of biological diversity, also provide enormous economic benefits to mankind through fishing, maintaining the groundwater of importance to agriculture, water storage and flood control, stability of coastlines, timber production, absorption of pollutants and water purification; These are also spaces for the development of recreational activities that make life possible on the planet.

Venezuela should be considered privileged by its special geographical condition of being at the same time Amazon, Andean, Atlantic, Caribbean, Llanos, Guianan and in the case of wetlands can highlight that the country's nine regions according to its basins are in the which are displayed about 24 categories of these ecosystems, for a total of 158 wetlands of special importance for its economic, social, cultural or ecological value.
Five of these are on the list of Wetlands of International Importance or Ramsar sites. The first designated was the Cuare Wildlife Refuge (Falcón state), Los Roques archipelago (Federal Dependences), Ciénaga Los Olivitos Wildlife Refuge and Fishing Reserve (Zulia state), the Laguna de la Restinga National Park (Nueva Esparta state) and Laguna de Tacarigua National Park (Miranda state)

To the north are the inland waters of Norte Beach and Los Cocos Beach, with more than 5 km long; as well as marine waters of Borracho Cay, which is a refuge for migratory birds.

Festivities
 March 19–21: Festivities in honor of St. Joseph
 July 16: Virgen del Carmen	
 August 15–17: Coconut's Fair
 September 8: Virgen del Valle
 September 29: Fiestas in honor to patron St. Michael the Archangel	
 October: Virgen de Fátima

External links
 all about Chichiriviche

Beaches of Venezuela
Tourist attractions in Falcón
Populated places in Falcón